Ryan Moore (born August 23, 1986 in Keene, New Hampshire) is an American soccer player currently without a club.

Career

Youth and Amateur
Moore played college soccer at St. Lawrence University, where he was named to the All-Liberty League Second Team as a sophomore, the All-Conference Second Team as a junior, and the NSCAA/Adidas All-Regional Team, the Lotto Classic All-Tournament Team, the All-Liberty League First Team, and the Liberty League All-Tournament Team as a senior.

During his college years Moore also played for Queen City in the National Premier Soccer League and the New Hampshire Phantoms in the USL Premier Development League.

Professional
While he was an exchange student in Kenya for the final semester of his senior year Moore trained with Kenyan Premier League champion club Mathare United; following his graduation from St. Lawrence he trialed at R.R.F.C. Montegnée in Liege, Belgium for three months, but was not offered a contract by the team.

Moore signed his first professional contract in 2010 when he was signed by AC St. Louis of the USSF Division 2 Professional League. He made his professional debut on April 10, 2010 in St. Louis's first ever game, against Carolina RailHawks

References

External links
 AC St. Louis bio

1986 births
Living people
American soccer players
AC St. Louis players
Seacoast United Phantoms players
USSF Division 2 Professional League players
USL League Two players
Soccer players from New Hampshire
People from Keene, New Hampshire
St. Lawrence University alumni
Association football midfielders